Peter Bürgisser (born 1962) is a Swiss mathematician and theoretical computer scientist who deals with algorithmic algebra and algebraic complexity theory.

Education and career
Bürgisser received in 1990 his doctorate from the University of Konstanz with thesis Degenerationsordnung und Trägerfunktional bilinearer Abbildungen under the supervision of Volker Strassen. Bürgisser was a postdoc at the University of Bonn from 1991 to 1993 and then at the University of Zürich. He was a professor at the University of Paderborn and since 2013 a professor at the Technical University of Berlin (TU Berlin).

His research deals with efficient algorithms for the solution of algebraic problems and lower bounds in the complexity of algebraic problems, as well as with symbolic and numerical algorithms and the probabilistic analysis of numerical algorithms.

With Felipe Cucker in 2011 he contributed to the solution of Smale's Problem No. 17.

Bürgisser was a visiting scholar at the Simons Institute for the Theory of Computing in Berkeley. He was also a visiting scholar at ETH Zurich.

In 2010, he was an invited speaker with talk Smoothed Analysis of Condition Numbers at the International Congress of Mathematicians in Hyderabad. He was a plenary speaker at the 2008 conference of the organization Foundations of Computational Mathematics (FoCM) in Hong Kong and organized workshops on complexity theory at the 2005, 2008 and 2011 workshops and in the 2009 and 2012 Oberwolfach workshops. He was elected a Fellow of the American Mathematical Society in 2012.

He is a member of the editorial staff of Foundations of Computational Mathematics.

In 2018 he was awarded an ERC Advanced Grant.

Further Activities 
In Bürgisser`s youth, he acted in four short-films by his school-mate Roger Steinmann as lead-actor.  'Die Flutkatastrophe' and 'Die Türe` were aired in the Swiss national TV DRS, the latter accompanied with an interview with Bürgisser.

Selected publications
 with 
 
 with Michael Clausen and Amin Shokrollahi: Algebraic Complexity Theory, Grundlehren der mathematischen Wissenschaften 315, Springer 1997

References

External links
 
 
 
 

20th-century German mathematicians
21st-century German mathematicians
Computer scientists
University of Konstanz alumni
Academic staff of the Technical University of Berlin
Academic staff of Paderborn University
Fellows of the American Mathematical Society
1962 births
Living people
European Research Council grantees